There are ten opera houses in the Czech Republic. The most important are the two opera houses in Prague - National Theatre (Prague) and Prague State Opera.

There are four other opera houses in Bohemia - in Plzeň, České Budějovice, Liberec and Ústí nad Labem - and four other opera houses in Moravia - in Brno, Ostrava, Olomouc and Opava.

List of the opera houses 
 National Theatre (Národní divadlo) in Prague - Estates Theatre (Stavovské divadlo) stage
 State Opera (Státní opera Praha) in Prague 
 National Theatre Brno (Národní divadlo Brno) - Janáček Theatre (Janáčkovo divadlo) stage
  (Jihočeské divadlo) in České Budějovice 
  (Divadlo F. X. Šaldy Liberec)
  (Moravské divadlo Olomouc)
  (Slezské divadlo Opava) 
 National Moravian-Silesian Theatre (Národní divadlo moravskoslezské)
 J. K. Tyl Theatre - (Divadlo J. K. Tyla v Plzni) in Plzeň
  (Severočeské divadlo opery a baletu) in Ústí nad Labem